
This is a list of tunnels documented by the Historic American Engineering Record in the US state of Oregon.

Tunnels

See also
List of bridges documented by the Historic American Engineering Record in Oregon

References

List
Tunnels
Tunnels
Oregon